Presidential elections were held in Romania in 2009. The first round took place on 22 November, with a run-off round between the top two candidates Traian Băsescu and Mircea Geoană on 6 December 2009. Although most exit polls suggested a win for Geoană in the runoff, the authorities declared Băsescu the narrow victor with 50.33% of the votes. To date, it is the closest election in Romanian history.

The opposition contested the results, citing a "high number of void ballots, modified voting protocols, and massive electoral tourism", vowing to challenge the result in the constitutional court. The Organization for Security and Co-operation in Europe (OSCE) declared that the election "was held generally in line with OSCE commitments", but also urged the authorities to investigate claims of fraud. On 8 December, the Social Democratic Party submitted a request to annul and repeat the run-off to the Constitutional Court, claiming it had been rigged. On 14 December, the Constitutional Court rejected the request after recounting all the annulled votes.

A referendum was held alongside the first round of voting on introducing a unicameral parliament of up to 300 deputies (replacing the existing bicameral parliament) and reducing the number of MPs to 300 but retaining the bicameral structure.

Candidates
There were twelve candidates of which three ran as independents. The candidates of the major parties were: the incumbent Traian Băsescu (formally independent, but supported by Democratic Liberal Party (PDL) and the official fraction of Christian-Democratic National Peasants' Party (PNŢ-CD), led by Marian Miluţ), Mircea Geoană (Social Democratic Party (PSD)), Crin Antonescu (National Liberal Party (PNL) and the contender fraction of PNŢ-CD, led by Radu Sârbu), Hunor Kelemen (Democratic Union of Hungarians in Romania (UDMR)) and Corneliu Vadim Tudor (Greater Romania Party (PRM)). Mayor of Bucharest Sorin Oprescu (formerly PSD member) announced his candidacy as an independent candidate on 5 October 2009; Băsescu also had been mayor of Bucharest before becoming president.

Radu, Prince of Hohenzollern-Veringen, husband of Princess Margarita of Romania first announced his candidacy to the office of President on 9 April 2009, but later withdrew.

Campaign

First round
The main contenders, incumbent Băsescu and the President of the Parliament Mircea Geoană, offered different ways to tackle the economic crisis, Romania being in the grip of severe recession with the economy expected to contract eight percent in 2009. While Geoană offered to increase investment to beat the recession and promised "vigorous measures" such as building affordable flats for young people and giving cheap credits to enterprises in order to help create jobs, Băsescu pledged to cut public spending. Băsescu also promised more equity to people living in the countryside. Christian Mititelu, a political commentator quoted by the BBC, argued that due to extremely vigorous political strife there was no real campaign debate about how the economy should recover or on the structure of the next year's budget, and that the public were not sufficiently aware of these economic issues, while the contenders did not attempt to communicate and involve the public in such decisions.

Băsescu tried to portray himself as the champion of the people against what he called "the corrupt political elite". A widely used election poster carried the text: "They cannot avoid what they are afraid of". Băsescu's opponents countered that he is part of that elite, simply with different backers. In a Cluj-Napoca meeting with supporters he claimed he "was the one to stop doubtful privatisations", implicitly accusing rival Social-Democrats of underhand practices while in power. He vowed to fight against the Parliament, which blocked his bid to install the Croitoru cabinet, and the "media moguls". In the campaign for the first round, his favorite campaign theme was reducing the number of lawmakers. This theme proved popular with the overwhelming majority of the electorate voting for the reduction of the number of lawmakers from current 471 to a maximum of 300, and in favor of a transition from the current bicameral parliament to a unicameral one in a referendum held simultaneously with the first round of elections. One of Băsescu's favorite themes is his fight against parliament and media moguls such as businessmen Dan Voiculescu, Sorin Ovidiu Vîntu, and Dinu Patriciu, politicians Ion Iliescu, Viorel Hrebenciuc, and Marian Vanghelie.

The main counter-candidate, Geoană, on the other hand, described himself as a "man of dialogue", who can "restore Romania's unity", allegedly "jeopardized" by Băsescu. A former ambassador to the United States, former foreign minister, and a seasoned diplomat, Geoană edged aside more powerful figures in his Social Democratic party.

In the first round held on 22 November, Băsescu came first with 32.44% of the votes, and Geoană second with 31.15%. According to a BBC analyst a victory by Geoană would be caused by the numerous enemies Băsescu has made during his tenure, especially in the media. On the other hand, a victory of the incumbent could be generated by his counter-candidate alleged lack of "human touch", and because doubts remain over his ability to control the "red barons" in his own party. Crin Antonescu [of the National Liberals who scored third with 20.02%] was the first choice of all those who are fed up with Băsescu but could not bring themselves to vote Socialist. His voters hold the key to victory on 6 December.

Second round
Although Băsescu claimed the results of the first round were "a significant vote for the right" because he and Crin Antonescu together received over 50% of the vote, the next day Antonescu refused to back Băsescu in the runoff, and shortly thereafter announced an alliance with Geoană. Subsequently, Băsescu reproached Antonescu to "have thrown himself in the arms of the Social-Democrat party, a party opposed to reforms", and added "This alliance will bring us back to 20 years ago when the PSD was controlling all state institutions". Antonescu in turn called Băsescu "a demagogue and a populist", and vowed to support Geoană as "the lesser of two evils". Geoană also gained the support of Béla Markó with his UDMR and George Becali with his New Generation Party – Christian Democratic.

Sorin Oprescu decided not to support anyone and Corneliu Vadim Tudor with his PRM—at national level—called his voters to boycott the runoff round; however the PRM in Sibiu county decided to support Geoană. Geoană announced he would nominate Klaus Iohannis as prime minister if he won.

Geoană promised to appoint Klaus Iohannis as Prime Minister of Romania if he was elected president. Iohannis was the candidate supported by a majority in the Parliament of Romania. Romania had a caretaker government since the government of Emil Boc fell on 13 October. The parliament rejected Traian Băsescu's nomination of Lucian Croitoru for new prime minister on 4 November.

Opinion polls
Note: Opinion polls have been criticised in this election for their unreliability, with large differences in results obtained between different polling agencies.

First round

Exit polls

Second round

Băsescu vs Geoană

Exit polls

Results

Both runoff candidates declared themselves winners after tight exit polls. On Monday, 7 December 2009 at 8 am, BEC published the first official partial results, after having counted the votes from 95.4% of the total of 21706 poll stations. According to these partial results, Traian Băsescu had achieved 50.43% of the total eligible votes, while Mircea Geoană got the rest of 49.57%. The official partial results tallied at 10:16 am (Monday, 7 December 2009) attested that Traian Băsescu achieved 50.37% of the total eligible votes and Mircea Geoană 49.62%. A majority of 78.86% the votes from abroad, fully counted in this tally, went for Băsescu (115,831 to 31,045). Some 94% of the estimated 200,000 Moldovans with Romanian citizenship who voted in the election cast their vote for Băsescu, who has been a vocal advocate of Moldovans' right to regain Romanian citizenship. Following final results, Sibiu mayor Klaus Iohannis announced that he is abandoning his bid to become prime minister in the current situation. Romanian stock markets fell to a four-month low after the official results were announced, deepening a political crisis that threatens ties with international lenders.

Aftermath

Accusations of electoral fraud
The opposition has decided to contest the result; Mircea Geoană announced that the Social Democrats will contest the elections at the Constitutional Court and will submit evidence of electoral fraud. PSD Secretary General Liviu Dragnea cited "a high number of void ballots, modified voting protocols, and massive electoral tourism". Dragnea stated: "Romanians voted for Mircea Geoană, but Băsescu's state apparatus is trying to make him the presidential winner through fraud". Former Prime Minister Adrian Năstase and former President Ion Iliescu, both PSD members, also stated that they doubted the results.

Mircea Geoană has also stated that the Social Democrats exclude any collaboration with Băsescu and his party, and maintain the majority with the Liberals and Hungarian Democrats, while Crin Antonescu also stated that the Liberal Party excludes "any participation in a Traian Băsescu puppet government".

Constitutional Court proceedings
On 8 December, the Social Democratic Party submitted their request to annul and repeat the presidential election run-off to the Constitutional Court, saying the election was rigged.

On 11 December, in an unprecedented decision the Constitutional Court decided to recount all 138,476 invalid votes. After 137,613 invalid votes recounted, only 2,137 were revalidated (1.6% of recounted invalid votes), 1,169 votes for Traian Băsescu and 968 for Mircea Geoană.

On 14 December, the Constitutional Court rejected the request to repeat the presidential elections, paving the way to validate Băsescu's election. The same day, Geoană admitted defeat and wished Băsescu good luck in his second term in office.

References

Further reading
Recession Bad, Communism Worse in Romania
OSCE second round preliminary report, press release 

Presidential elections in Romania
Romanian presidential election
Romanian presidential election
Romanian presidential
President